This article lists characters who have appeared on the Canadian drama-action television series Flashpoint.

[[File:Flashpoint cast.jpg|right|thumb|500px|Main cast of Flashpoint'''s Strategic Response Unit. From left to right: Ed Lane (Hugh Dillon), Julianna "Jules" Callaghan (Amy Jo Johnson), Lewis "Lou" Young (Mark Taylor), Gregory "Greg" Parker (Enrico Colantoni), Mike "Spike" Scarlatti (Sergio Di Zio), Roland "Rolie" Cray (Gabriel Hogan) and Kevin "Wordy" Wordsworth (Michael Cram). Gabriel Hogan only appeared in the first episode Scorpio and was replaced by David Paetkau, who plays Sam Braddock. He is not included in the photo.]]

 SRU 
The Strategic Response Unit, modeled after the Toronto Police Service's Emergency Task Force unit, is responsible for high-risk situations that cannot be resolved by regular police officers, such as activities involving armed criminals or explosives, or requiring hostage rescues or counter-terrorism measures. The SRU is also responsible for providing support to other police officers when requested. There are five teams in the SRU, Team 1 being the one mainly featured in the show.

 Main characters 

 Greg Parker 

Sergeant Gregory "Greg" Parker is the Sergeant and leader of Team One. He is also Team 1's main crisis negotiator. As such, he prefers that situations be resolved through negotiations instead of lethal force, keeping that as a last resort. He learned the art of negotiation when he was able to survive a hard life under his strict father. The stressful nature of his previous job as a homicide detective took a toll on him and resulted in him turning to alcohol, resulting in his divorce and estrangement from his wife and son Dean. His ex-wife gained full custody of Dean and they moved to Dallas, Texas. She was still bitter and bans her ex-husband from seeing Dean for some time. In the Season 1 episode "Backwards Day" it is revealed that he had just seen his son for the first time in eight years, regretting that he did not do so earlier. Dean eventually goes back to Toronto on his own volition to ask his father to stop contacting him but witnesses Greg and the SRU on a call and realizes the importance of his father's job. Father and son reconnect as Dean began to visit Toronto regularly beginning in season 3. In the season 4 episode "A Call to Arms", he asks to move back to Toronto with his father.

Greg cares not only for his team, but for the lives of the innocents and those subjects who are about to make a mistake that will ruin an otherwise good life. He often puts the blame for a failed attempt to save a life solely on himself, something Ed frequently reminds him of. A recurring theme for him is that he always reminds his teammates to "keep the peace" during any SRU-led operation.

In the two-part series finale, "Keep the Peace", Greg is shot in the leg as he is holding off a mad bomber while trying to defuse his bomb.  His leg wound forces him to retire from SRU, and a year later, he is teaching at the police academy. In a deleted scene, Dean and Ed's son Clark are both cadets at the police academy.

 Ed Lane 

Constable (later Sergeant) Edward "Ed" Lane is the veteran of the Strategic Response Unit team, he is the team's tactical leader in the field. Ed's secondary role is to act as the crisis negotiator in direct contact with the subject(s). Though he has been trained to use lethal force, Ed is constantly troubled with the fact that he sometimes needs to use it to save the lives of others.Hugh do you think you are?.  Retrieved on August 18, 2008.

Ed has some problems with his wife of fifteen years, Sophie, and teenage son Clark due to the nature of his job, and the fact that he is strongly attached to his SRU colleagues. For example, he deliberately missed the anniversary of his in-laws and Clark's cello recital for work and a colleague's retirement party respectively. The couple begin to drift apart and there were hints at a separation but with the birth of their daughter Isabelle, they have reconciled.When Family and Job Come Into Conflict, a Policeman’s Lot Is Not a Happy One.  Retrieved on August 18, 2008. Ed has a brother Roy, a detective with the Guns and Gangs task force.

In Season 5, Ed is forced to shoot an eighteen-year-old girl to stop her from killing her abusive father holding her mother at gunpoint. The team was eventually cleared as they were following protocol but for the rest of the season, Ed struggles with the guilt. In "Sons of the Father", the girl's mother expresses willingness to forgive him, but he refuses to accept her forgiveness. In "Forget Oblivion", Ed starts seeing the girl after he beats Sam during target practice. He finally sought counselling in the episode "Fit for Duty", after a hostage situation where he had froze when he was cleared to shoot an armed and increasingly violent schizophrenic man.

After the events of "Keep the Peace", Ed is promoted to Sergeant after a leg wound forces Greg to retire from SRU (as seen in the flash-forward). Clark eventually joins Dean Parker in following their fathers' footsteps, but the scene was deleted from the final cut.

 Jules Callaghan 

Constable Julianna "Jules" Callaghan was the only woman on Team One initially and is the primary love interest of Sam Braddock. Before Leah joined the team, Jules was the only woman and the sign outside the women's locker room read 'Jules' rather than 'Women'. In the later episodes of season two as well as in select other episodes, Jules often acts as an intelligence gatherer alongside Sgt. Parker. This role is necessary during times in which the subject(s) need to be properly profiled in order for the team to make the proper tactical choice. She's also a backup negotiator, and along with Ed and Sam, she is a trained sniper. Prior to her transfer to the SRU, Jules served as an officer with the Royal Canadian Mounted Police. Jules has 4 brothers and mentioned in one episode that she was from Medicine Hat, Alberta.

Jules was shot by a sniper during season 2 episode 4, and was in the hospital for several weeks/episodes during the second season. During her period of recovery, she was briefly replaced on Team One by Constable Donna Sabine, played by Jessica Steen, who upon the return of Jules transferred to another team within the SRU which eventually led her to become the leader of Team 3.

Sam has been attracted to Jules ever since his recruitment to the SRU unit and the two of them dated over a period of several episodes, strengthening an already strong protective sense towards each other. It is revealed in the beginning of "Between Heartbeats" that Parker knows they are in a relationship, leading to a conversation where they discuss their future together versus their future in the team.  The conversation is cut short, and later, when Jules is shot, Sam is devastated.  When the rogue sniper takes Ed hostage, Sam is the one who makes the kill shot. He rushes to the hospital, where he holds her hand and cries saying he should've protected her. When Jules returns to the team after being shot, she breaks up with him, saying that they "can't keep breaking the rules forever" although, at the same time, reveals that she loves him. She broke up with him so that they could both stay with the 'family' (SRU Team 1), knowing that if their relationship was ever exposed one of them would have to transfer. In particular, Jules didn't like the idea of sneaking around behind the backs of their friends and teammates. In the Season 4 premiere, it was revealed that Jules and Sam were getting back together because they realized their love for each other "wasn't going to go away" and kissed at Sam's apartment. This revelation was brought about by their intense questioning about their relationship from Dr. Toth, who was performing psychological evaluations in the Season 3 finale. At the end of the Season 4 premiere, Dr. Toth makes it a condition of the team's probation that they keep their relationship strictly professional. Through season 4, they are in a secret relationship that they are keeping hidden from the rest of Team One. In the episode 'The Cost of Doing Business' (4x10) Greg Parker finds out about their relationship and, at the end of the episode, he allows them to keep the relationship a secret provided their attitude doesn't change at work. In 'Priority of Life' (4x17), the work dynamic between Jules and Sam is addressed again when Jules is locked in a room with an armed subject as the confined lab quickly fills with Anthrax. Sam has an opportunity to bring an injured hostage or Jules to safety and, choosing to observe the Priority of Life Code, saves the hostage. Meanwhile, unbeknownst to the rest of the team, Greg Parker has been suspended by Dr. Toth for concealing Jules and Sam's relationship. Greg and Dr. Toth watch the code being observed over a video feed, and Dr. Toth later tells Sam he will talk to Commander Holleran and try to allow them to stay on Team One together. At the end of Season 4 they receive the news that they're both allowed to stay on Team One together while being in a relationship. In "We Take Care of Our Own", it is revealed that Jules is pregnant. Jules and Sam get married in "Keep the Peace (Part 1)". In "Keep the Peace (Part 2)", a year later, their daughter Sadie is born.

 Sam Braddock 

Constable Samuel "Sam" Braddock was first introduced in the pilot episode as Team One's new recruit to replace the newly promoted Roland 'Rolie' Cray. Due to his experience in Afghanistan, Sam believed that lethal force was the solution instead of using negotiation to resolve situations, which some of his colleagues objected to. His transfer to Team One is generally well received, however, and after training and guidance he becomes a valued member of the team, going out for drinks and joking with the rest of the team. Due to his military background, he is a highly skilled marksman and disciplined team player who is able to think on his feet and remain calm under duress, which the team comes to value. He is also nicknamed "Samtastic" by Spike after he aces his first shooting practice, which was run by Jules. His main role is as a sniper on the team, although he has covered for Ed as the team's tactical leader in Season 4 while Ed recovered from an injury. He is often Greg's next choice as "Sierra One" (the code for the designated sniper who will be taking the "kill shot" if needed) after Ed.

Sam was a police officer with 51 Division before joining the Canadian Army, where he reached the rank of Master Corporal. He was a sniper with the Canadian Special Forces' Joint Task Force 2 and served on two tours of duty, one of which was with Task Force K-Bar, in Afghanistan. Having lost comrades to suicide and friendly fire, he is particularly affected by cases involving veterans and would volunteer himself as the negotiator as he is able to relate to them, as shown in the episodes "Behind the Blue Line" and "We Take Care of Our Own".

Sam is generally reticent about his personal life; what little is known about his personal life is often from the information he divulges during negotiations with suspects. His father is a General who is apparently known by the sobriquet "Badass" and whose name has never been revealed. Sam once stated that he addresses his father as "Sir" at home and often refers to him as "The General". Throughout the show Sam clashes with his father multiple times over the latter constantly asking Sam to go back to the military. By Season 5, they seem to have reconciled, as Sam is seen speaking to his father on the phone about helping veterans, after closing a case where he had to talk down a suicidal veteran whose wife had died while he was deployed in Afghanistan. It was revealed in the episode "Acceptable Risk" that he had a younger sister whom he, at the age of nine, witnessed being hit by a car while crossing the street. She died instantly, which has made him extremely protective of members of his team, most notably Jules. His other younger sister Natalie appears to be the opposite of her older brother; Sam is disciplined and focused while she is free-spirited and carefree. She appears in Season 4 looking for a job in Toronto. At times Sam seems annoyed by his sister's spontaneity but he is protective of her. Jules surmises in the episode "Run, Jamie, Run" that Natalie was perhaps trying to find her own place in the world after having to grow up in a military family with a strict father and in the shadow of an older brother who is "the poster boy for perfection".

He is attracted to Jules from the beginning, and sometimes comes across as overprotective, partly because of his feelings and partly because of her gender (while he's not sexist and he values her skills, his experience watching his sister die has made him particularly protective of women). In season 1 episode 10, he kissed Jules, and offered to drive her home after he realized she blamed herself for the events of the day. After that episode, Sam and Jules are in a relationship which they keep secret since they are not allowed to date because they are on the same team. It is revealed in the beginning of "Between Heartbeats" that Parker knows they are in a relationship, leading to a conversation where they discuss their future together versus their future in the team.  The conversation is cut short, and later, when Jules is shot, Sam is devastated.  When the rogue sniper takes Ed hostage, Sam is the one who makes the kill shot. He rushes to the hospital, where he holds her hand and cries saying he should've protected her. When Jules returns to the team after being shot, she breaks up with him, saying that they "can't keep breaking the rules forever". Sam understands, and sadly agrees to end the relationship, but even after the breakup, he is seen flirting with her on various occasions. He is incredibly protective of her and always wants to keep her safe. In the Season 3 finale, he and Jules are questioned by Dr. Toth (a psychological examiner with a specialty in team psychology) about their relationship, which prompts them to realize they still have feelings for each other. In the Season 4 premiere, Jules shows up at his apartment and he tells her that their love "isn't going to go away," and they kiss passionately. At the end of the Season 4 premiere, Dr. Toth makes it a condition of the team's probation that they keep their relationship strictly professional. Through season 4, they are in a secret relationship that they are keeping hidden from the rest of Team One. In the episode 'The Cost of Doing Business' (4x10) Greg Parker finds out about their relationship and, at the end of the episode, he allows them to keep the relationship a secret provided their attitude doesn't change at work. In 'Priority of Life' (4x17), the work dynamic between Jules and Sam is addressed again when Jules is locked in a room with an armed subject as the confined space quickly fills with Anthrax. Sam has an opportunity to bring an injured hostage or Jules to safety and, choosing to observe the Priority of Life Code, saves the hostage. Meanwhile, unbeknownst to the rest of the team, Greg Parker has been suspended by Dr. Toth for concealing Jules and Sam's relationship. Greg and Dr. Toth watch the code being observed over a video feed, and Dr. Toth later tells Sam he will talk to Commander Holleran and try to allow them to stay on Team One together. At the end of Season 4 they receive the news that they're both allowed to stay on Team One together while being in a relationship.  In "We Take Care of Our Own", it's revealed that Jules is pregnant with Sam's baby. As of "Keep the Peace (Part 1)", Sam and Jules are married in the presence of Sam's parents (portrayed by David Paetkau's real-life parents), Jules' father and brothers and their co-workers at the SRU and Jules announces that she was three months pregnant, much to everyone's delight. In "Keep the Peace (Part 2)", in the flash forward a year later, they have a daughter Sadie and Sam is leader of Team Three.

 Michelangelo "Spike" Scarlatti 

Constable Michelangelo "Spike" Scarlatti is the team's technical analyst and demolitions expert who usually provides communications support and surveillance from the command post. During his free time he is sometimes seen trying to perfect various gadgets or trying out his anti-explosives robot, nicknamed "Babycakes". He was nicknamed 'Spike' by his former training officer because of his usually 'spikey' hair. As one of the younger members of the team and the optimist, he is always trying to learn from the veterans and would lighten the mood in the locker room with his jokes.

Spike is proud of his Italian heritage, as shown by the fact that he mentions this multiple times, speaks the language and follows soccer (Italy's main sport). His family is said to be from Woodbridge, a community north of Toronto known for its historically large population of Italian Canadians, although his mother is likely a more recent immigrant due to her thick accent. Although there are no mentions of siblings, Spike comes from a large family and has mentioned various relatives in Italy. He lives with his parents Dominic and Michelina but is estranged from his father over his job in the SRU. In the finale of Season 3 "Fault Lines", it is revealed that Dominic has been terminally ill for some time and is dying. Spike is forced to make a decision between going to his father's side or disarming a time bomb (he was the only one with the technical knowledge to do so). He successfully stops the bomb with seconds to spare and was able to rush to the hospital. Father and son reconcile after the former confesses that the reason he wanted Spike to quit was that he was afraid of losing his only child in the line of duty. After his father's death, Spike's mother moves back Italy to be with her family and he is forced to live on his own for the first time, which his team ribs him about endlessly.

He and Lou were best friends and frequently paired on the field; they even made a leisure trip to Ocho Rios together. Spike tried to save Lou's life when he stepped on the landmine, however was unsuccessful. Lou's death had enormous adverse effects on Spike, as seen in several episodes following his death.

Spike is shocked when Greg quits in the middle of the finale of Season 4, saying: "Guys, did that just happen?" from the control room in apparent disbelief. He is overjoyed when Greg decides to stay on the Team as he is very loyal and hates to see the team being broken up. This is proved in 'The Good Citizen' when Greg confronts Spike about a branch of the Federal Government coming to speak to him about recruiting Spike. He is wanted by several different agencies and, as pointed out by Wordy in 'Fault Lines' "Can pick up and leave whenever he wants.". However, Spike decides to remain with the team showing that although leaving would advance his career, he remains loyal to the SRU and Team One. In Season 5, episode 4 "Eyes In", Spike tries asking Winnie out, which she turns down, admitting that she doesn't date cops because she needs balance in her life, not as a fake rule to let guys down easy. She implies that if it weren't an unbreakable rule, she'd break it for him saying "the perfect guy just came along." In the series finale, "Keep the Peace", a year later, Spike and Winnie officially become a couple.

 Winnie Camden 
Constable Winnie Camden (Tattiawna Jones; seasons 2–5, main; 1, recurring)
 Female SRU dispatcher working with Team 1 from Season 1, Episode 15 on (except for episodes 22, 34, and 35). She is the main dispatcher that works with Team One from Season 2 on, and has been vital in solving pieces of the puzzles in some of the team's toughest calls. In "Eyes In", Spike tries asking Winnie out, which she turns down, admitting that she doesn't date cops because she needs balance in her life, not as a fake rule to let guys down easy. She implies that if it weren't an unbreakable rule, she'd break it for him saying "the perfect guy just'' came along." In the series finale, "Keep the Peace", Winnie and Spike officially become a couple.

Leah Kerns 
Constable Leah Kerns (Oluniké Adeliyi; season 5, main; 2–3 recurring)
  A former firefighter. She joins the SRU after Lewis "Lou" Young's sudden death. She first appears in Season 2, Episode 11, "Never Let You Down." In early season 3, she said to have gone on leave for personal reasons. In Season 5, episode "Run to Me", Leah has returned to the team, having previously left to assist her parents after the Haiti earthquake.

Former characters 
Constable (later Sergeant) Roland "Rolie" Cray (Gabriel Hogan; pilot)
 One of the older members of the SRU unit, he was transferred out to another unit after he had been accepted for promotion as sergeant during the pilot episode.

Constable Lewis "Lou" Young (Mark Taylor; seasons 1–2)
 Serving on the team as a less-lethal weapons operator, trying to help others due to his former gangster life before he decided to reform and join the police. Lewis' knowledge on street gangs was helpful to the SRU team. Lou was killed in action when he stepped on a landmine while defusing a bomb on a college campus in the Season 2 episode, "One Wrong Move" (In some version of the released videos this is Ep1 of Season 3). When it became clear that any attempt to rescue him would likely result in the death of another member of the SRU, Lou sacrificed himself by activating the mine. He was Spike's best friend and was frequently paired with him on the field. In 'Never Let You Down', Leah Kerns is brought in as Lou's replacement, and she presents the team with wristbands in order to honour their fallen team mate.
 Lewis' running gag on the first episodes involved him being in charge of less-lethal weapons in any SRU-mandated operation, to his casual annoyance.

Dr. Amanda Luria (Ruth Marshall; season 1)
 She serves in the SRU as the unit's psychologist in Season 1 only, specializing in the psychology of violent criminals, hostage negotiation and PTSD. Her absence for the remainder of the series was left unexplained.

Detective Kevin "Wordy" James Wordsworth (Michael Cram; seasons 1–4, main; 5, guest)
 The other married operator in the SRU along with Ed, Wordy is the team's entry tactics and CQB expert and less-lethal weapons specialist aside from Lewis.  He's also often in charge of acquiring visual inside the area of the operations through several type of surveillance gadgets. He has three young daughters, and often takes a lot of teasing from his friends and colleagues for being a little 'too in touch' with his feminine side as a result. He is a family man and has stated that he was willing to do "anything that helps me get closer to Shelly and my girls", be it watching a chick flick or learning to braid hair, in order to relate with them. It was revealed in Season 1, Episode 4, "Asking for Flowers," that his wife, Shelley, was once in an abusive marriage, and he is very protective of her and strongly against domestic violence. He left the team after revealing that he was suffering from Parkinson's Disease. Wordy is currently a detective with the Guns and Gangs Unit.

Constable Rafik "Raf" Rousseau (Clé Bennett; season 4, main; 5, guest)

Raf replaced Kevin Wordsworth in the middle season 4 after Wordy leaves Team One. Raf is ambitious and eager to learn from the rest of the team, but displays a reckless streak born out of his desire to prove himself; for instance, he entered a room with a hostile subject without waiting for approval from Parker.

It was revealed in 'A Day in the Life' that his father is in jail because he attacked a teacher who sexually assaulted Raf when he was in high school. He and his father are still close and he understands why his father did what he did.

Raf is a musician and plays the piano and sings as shown in Episode 4x06 'A Day in the Life' when he sings in a restaurant for many patrons (including Sam, Jules, Spike and Natalie) on Valentine's Day .

After "Broken Peace", Raf apparently left the team after having come to grips with the grey area resolving around shooting a teenage girl to prevent her shooting her estranged abusive father holding her mother at gunpoint.

Constable Donna Sabine (Jessica Steen; seasons 2–5, recurring)
 Donna was Jules' replacement after Jules took a temporary leave of absence to recover from the gunshot wound she sustains in the S1 Finale, 'Between Heartbeats'. The members of Team One selected her out of an initial group 300 applicants for the position. In 'Clean Hands', Donna is forced to shoot a LEO who was conspiring to kill an alleged serial killer, an act that left her emotionally distraught. Greg Parker advises her that "We have a saying here: Just because you did right doesn't mean you get to feel right."

Donna's last call with Team One was episode 'Remote Control', where she again must take a fatal shot, this time killing a drug dealer on the verge of executing a pregnant woman. As Greg is about to tell her that Jules will be returning to take her place, Donna advises him that "Team Three has a spot for me", ensuring that she will still be with the SRU.

She appears again in Season 3 finale, 'Fault Lines', as the leader of Team Three, running an evaluation test on Team One. In 'Personal Effects', the continuation of 'Fault Lines', her team joins forces with Team One to track down Ed Lane's shooter. At the conclusion of the episode, her team apprehends a heroin dealer with connections to the man who wounded Ed.

Donna marries an I.T. specialist named Hank Gerald in the Season 4 episode, 'A New Life'. This was the most Donna-centric episode of the series, as her past in the vice squad comes back to haunt her. Members of her undercover team are apparently being hunted down by an old enemy, and shots are fired at her wedding. Donna is betrayed by her former partner, Bill Kedrick, who unwittingly gave information to the wrong man, and is coerced into trying to kill Hank.

Briefly, Donna is seen with Hank in the finale of Season 4, 'Slow Burn' attending the SRU BBQ.

Her final appearance came in the series finale, 'Keep the Peace', when Donna and another member of Team Three are killed by a bomb strapped to a man named Anson Holt. A plaque is later placed on her locker at SRU Headquarters (Ed is seen looking at it in part 2 of 'Keep the Peace'.) The plaque states: 'Dedicated to the memory of Constable Donna Sabine, who gave her life to keep the peace'. Ed toasts both Donna and Lou when Team 1 gathers for the last time.

Supporting characters 

Sophie Lane  (Janaya Stephens)
 The wife of Ed Lane, they have been married for seventeen years. Mother to Clark Lane and Isabel Lane. Sophie is generally a very supportive spouse, and puts up with Ed's heavy workload for much of the marriage. However, her patience for this lessened during her pregnancy with Izzy. The first real indication that she was unhappy came during the events of 'Unconditional Love', where Ed's brother, Roy, disobeys an order to hang back, and his partner is killed. Ed was supposed to have been with Sophie for her first sonogram, but goes with the team to respond to the call, much to her frustration and disappointment. Sophie eventually makes the decision to leave Ed for the duration of her pregnancy, and takes Clark with her. In "I'd Do Anything", Ed reveals to Greg that Sophie has issued an ultimatum: he must choose between the family and the job. Later in "Fault Lines", Sophie goes into labor while Team 1 is undergoing their routine requalification and psychological evaluations. It is a very difficult labor for Sophie and the baby is in distress. Ed leaves in the middle of his psych evaluation to be with his wife. On the way to the hospital, Ed is shot in an apparent case of road rage. He refuses treatment in order to be with Sophie who is waiting for a c-section, because baby Issy is in fetal distress.  Ed makes promises to both Sophie, Issy that he'll be there for them after having almost lost both of them during the delivery.  After 5 months of therapy, healing and being a husband and father again Ed returns to the SRU to turn in his badge, but Sophie stops him knowing that the SRU is part of who he is.  She states what she needs from him (no overtime, no pre-shift workouts, et al.) and for Ed to be on baby duty on his time off, so she can start a catering business.  Ed is beyond happy as is the team to have him back as Team One's Team Leader. Sophie's final appearance is in 'Keep the Peace, Pt. 2', as she learns that her son, Clark, has been caught in one of the bombings. Ed is able to find him, and he reassures her that while Clark is hurt, he's safe.

Clark Lane (Tyler Stentiford) 
 The son of Ed and Sophie Lane

Dean Parker (Jack Knight)
 The formerly-estranged son of Sgt. Greg Parker, Dean was 6 years old when his mother left his father due to his alcoholism and moved to Dallas, Texas.  In season 3, Dean and his father began to reconnect during a visit to Toronto, which eventually led to Dean moving in with his father and completing his senior year of high school in Canada.

 Despite being accepted into a good college, Dean announced his intention to follow in his father's footsteps and apply to the Police Academy, something his dad strenuously objected to.  The two later compromised – Dean promised to go to college and earn his degree before joining the force.

Natalie "Nat" Braddock (Rachel Skarsten)
 Another sister of Sam Braddock starting in season four. She and Spike briefly dated during Season four, however Spike ended the relationship when Natalie pushed for their relationship to move to a more intimate one and didn't want Sam to think he was taking advantage of his sister. In the episode 4x15 'Blue on Blue' she is kidnapped by her ex, David Fleming (Michael Shanks) and calls Spike asking for help before the call is cut off. Spike leaves the team to help her and ends up becoming a hostage when David threatens to kill Natalie. After they are rescued by Team One, Natalie kisses him on the cheek to say goodbye and thank you and the two remain friends.

Constable Kira Marlowe (Pascale Hutton)
 The second female SRU dispatcher (badge number 1626) working with Team 1 in multiple episodes in Season 1 & 2. In the Season 1 episode 12, "Haunting the Barn" she was briefly taken hostage by Danny Rangford, a retired SRU veteran.

Constable Peter Henderson (Stephen Amell)
 Male SRU dispatcher working with Team 1 on episode 22.

Constable Sidney Nelson (Nathan Mitchell)
 Male SRU dispatcher working with Team 1 on episodes 34–35.

Deputy Chief of Police Norm Holleran (Philip Akin)
 Serves as the commanding officer of all SRU units.

Inspector Stainton (Bill MacDonald)
 Police officer who is often seen co-ordinating non-SRU police officers during SRU operations. He is featured in several episodes throughout the seasons.

Dr. Larry Toth (Victor Garber)
 Military psychologist, who came to re-qualify their team on episodes 44–45 and 61. He was mentioned in episodes 49 and 62.

References

External links 
 
 Flashpoint on CTV 

Lists of Canadian television series characters
Flashpoint
Flashpoint (TV series)